Jan Dam (born 7 September 1968) is a Faroese former former professional footballer who played as a defender. At present, he works as a teacher at a Faroese public school and also as a reserve team coach at the football club EB/Streymur.

Club career
Dam made his debut in Faroese football at the age of 17 with HB Tórshavn as a defender in the 1986 season and remained with the club for ten years before he moved abroad to Danish side Ølstykke FC. He returned home after only one season to join KÍ Klaksvík and later HB again and B68.

International career
Dam made his debut for the Faroe Islands in an August 1990 friendly match against Iceland in which he immediately scored from the penalty spot after coming on as a substitute for Abraham Løkin Hansen. The penalty was awarded after foul on Jan. His second match was the 1–0 defeat of Austria, his country's first competitive match. On his third international duty, away to Denmark, he set Brian Laudrup out of the game, despite Faroes losing the match 4–1. His last international match was an April 2000 friendly against Liechtenstein. Dam collected 39 caps, scoring one goal.

Career statistics
Scores and results list Faroe Islands' goal tally first, score column indicates score after each Dam goal.

References

External links
 
 Profile at B68

1968 births
Living people
Faroese footballers
Association football defenders
Faroe Islands international footballers
Havnar Bóltfelag players
KÍ Klaksvík players
B68 Toftir players
Ølstykke FC players